Katherine Solange Ortiz Simisterra (born 16 February 1991) is an Ecuadorian professional footballer. She was part of the Ecuadorian squad for the 2015 FIFA Women's World Cup.

International career
Ortiz represented Ecuador at the 2008 South American U-17 Women's Championship.

References

External links
 
 Profile  at FEF
 

1991 births
Living people
People from Guayaquil
Ecuadorian women's footballers
Ecuador women's international footballers
Place of birth missing (living people)
2015 FIFA Women's World Cup players
Women's association football defenders
Footballers at the 2015 Pan American Games
Pan American Games competitors for Ecuador
21st-century Ecuadorian women